"Csordapásztorok" ("Shepherds" in English) is one of the oldest Hungarian Christmas carols.

Its lyrics (with the note "old song") can be found in Benedek Szőlősy's book, the Cantus Catholici, which was first published in 1651. Its music was first recorded in the Deák-Szentes manuscript, which was written between 1741 and 1774 by Mózes Szentes.

Lyrics and music

Lyrics

See also
 List of Christmas carols

References
 Szent vagy, Uram! Orgonakönyv. Szent István Társulat, 1974., 20. ének. 
 Hungarian Catholic lesson: 
 Hungarian Catholic lesson:

External links
Videos:
 
 
 
 Origin: Pataki Henrik: A «Csordapásztorok» karácsonyi ének szerzője

Christmas carols
17th-century hymns